The Individual Visit Scheme begun on 28 July 2003  allowing travelers from Mainland China to visit Hong Kong and Macau on an individual basis; prior to the Scheme, Mainland residents could only visit on business visas or on group tours.

The outbreak of SARS in Hong Kong from March to June 2003 resulted in a sharp drop in Mainland and foreign visitors to an unprecedented low, adversely affecting the tourist industry.

The main reason for launching the Individual Visit Scheme was to boost the economy of Hong Kong and Macau. In the initial stage of the scheme, residents of Beijing, Shanghai, and 8 Guangdong provincial cities (Dongguan, Foshan, Guangzhou, Huizhou, Jiangmen, Shenzhen, Zhongshan and Zhuhai) could apply for visas to visit the two 'Special Administrative Regions' individually. 

The scheme was extended to all 21 cities of Guangdong province in July 2004, and to 9 other cities in Jiangsu, Zhejiang, and Fujian provinces in July 2004.

The visas, issued by the Public Security Bureau of the People's Republic of China, were valid for 7 days and could be renewed upon return from Hong Kong to the Mainland.

The scheme brought an immediate surge in the number of Mainland visitors. In the short period between 28 July and 4 November 2003, more than 600,000 individuals on the Mainland applied for visas and 450,000 visas were issued. The number of visitors under the scheme reached two million by May 2004.

1 October Golden Week
1 October Golden Week is the period from 1 to 7 October, coinciding with the National Day of the People's Republic of China on 1 October. Therefore, more Mainlanders are able to visit Hong Kong during the holiday. In 2003, this holiday drew 287,000 Mainland visitors to Hong Kong, including 80,000 to 90,000 individual travellers. During, the hotel occupancy rate reached 75% to 80%. The Mass Transit Railway Corporation organised promotional programs at Telford Plaza in Kowloon Bay and Maritime Square in Tsing Yi during the National Day holiday.

In addition, the HKSAR Government has adopted a number of measures to deal with the huge influx of individual visitors. At the Lo Wu border crossing, there was an increase in the number of Hong Kong immigration officers on duty, and the time for checking in was reduced. Also, the number of MTR trains departing from Lo Wu was increased to reduce congestion. In addition, visitors from Shanghai and Beijing were encouraged to travel by plane to prevent congestion in Lo Wu and Lok Ma Chau.

According to the statistics released by the Immigration Department, about 800,000 to 900,000 Mainland visitors travel to Hong Kong monthly. The ratio of visitors under the scheme rose from 5% to 16.8% between August and October 2003, and to more than 30% in May 2004. 

The increase in the number of Mainland tourists has benefits the economy of Hong Kong, demonstrating the economy is on an upward track. Average occupancy rate across all categories of hotels and tourist guest houses in September 2003 was 82%, the same as that in September 2002. This performance was spread across different types of hotels, with the top-tariff hotels achieving 81% occupancy and those of medium tariff recording 83%. The average achieved room rate was HK$684, the highest figure since April 2003, although this is still 2.8% below the comparable rate for September 2002. And in 2006,among the spending of all the visitors in Hong Kong, mainland visitors has taken up to $400 billion, which is one-third of the income.

The government has set up an Economy Relaunch Campaign, which includes raffles, the Lantau Festival, and Individual Visits to provide extra resources to revive the economy. These enhance the appeal of the Individual Visit Scheme.

"As the scheme is attracting a large number of Mainlanders to Hong Kong, it created a 'positive by-product' to attract overseas travelers to visit Hong Kong," said Miss Kinnie Wong, the assistant commissioner of the Tourism Commission. She added that tourists from overseas markets such as the United States and Australia may feel safe visiting Hong Kong again in the coming winter or during the Chinese New Year.

It has been suggested that more and more Mainlanders coming to Hong Kong will lead to the authorised saving of Ain Hong Kong. This change enables Mainland travellers access to money more easily when they need it. As a result, it will be more convenient for them to shop and trade in Hong Kong. Besides, the simplicity of the visa application process makes it beneficial. Since people are usually not willing to perform complicated procedures to apply for visas before visiting another place, the Individual Visit Scheme helps encourage visitors to Hong Kong. These two effects are considered long term.

She also pointed out that women joining the Individual Visit Scheme come to Hong Kong because they want to purchase brand-name products. An individual traveller, Mrs. Chiu, said that the brand-name products in Hong Kong are of more variety and are much cheaper when compared with other foreign countries.

As a short-term effect, there will be a rise in the employment rate and investment. Owners of shops or companies can foresee this vital trend and will employ more people to meet the needs of the influx of Mainland travellers.

Social impact
The Hong Kong Government repeatedly pointed out that the crime rate of Mainland visitors under the scheme was very low. From August 2003 to May 2004, the number of individual visitors who were arrested for committing crimes such as theft or fraud was only 183, compared with more than 2 million visitors under the scheme.

Mr. Chan Wing-Kai, the head of the Consumer Complaints & Advice Council, said, "The percentage of complaints made by individual visitors is 9.3%, which is relatively low." The number of complaints made by individual visitors up to October was around 50. Many cases were due to misunderstandings, such as differences between consumer cultures.

Timetable of implementation
28 July 2003: Dongguan, Foshan, Zhongshan, Jiangmen
20 August 2003: Guangzhou, Shenzhen, Zhuhai, Huizhou
1 September 2003: Shanghai, Beijing
1 January 2004: Shantou, Chaozhou, Meizhou, Zhaoqing, Qingyuan, Yunfu
1 May 2004: Shanwei, Maoming, Zhanjiang, Shaoguan, Jieyang, Heyuan, Yangjiang (That covered the whole Guangdong province.)
1 July 2004: Nanjing, Suzhou, Wuxi, Hangzhou, Ningbo, Taizhou, Fuzhou (urban area only), Xiamen, Quanzhou
1 March 2005: Tianjin, Chongqing (15 districts and counties only)
1 November 2005: Chengdu, Jinan, Dalian, Shenyang
1 May 2006: Nanchang, Changsha, Nanning, Haikou, Guiyang, Kunming
1 January 2007: Shijiazhuang, Zhengzhou, Changchun, Hefei, Wuhan

Macau visa restrictions

April 2007: 2 visits per month.
May 2008: 1 visit per month.
July 2008: 1 visit per two months.
August 2008: travellers through Macao to another destination in China are only allowed to stay in Macao for 7 days vs. prior 14 days.
September 2008: eliminated a loophole that allowed Chinese residents to travel to Macao using a Hong Kong visa.
October 2008: 1 visit per three months.

See also
Tourism in Hong Kong

References

External links
 Hong Kong Tourism Board

Tourism in Hong Kong
Tourism in Macau